Sündersbühl station is a Nuremberg U-Bahn station, located on the U3.

References

Nuremberg U-Bahn stations
Railway stations in Germany opened in 2008
2008 establishments in Germany